Psenes is a genus of driftfishes native to the Indian, Atlantic and Pacific oceans.

Species
There are currently five recognized species in this genus:
 Psenes arafurensis Günther, 1889 (Banded driftfish)
 Psenes cyanophrys Valenciennes, 1833 (Freckled driftfish)
 Psenes maculatus Lütken, 1880 (Silver driftfish)
 Psenes pellucidus Lütken, 1880 (Bluefin driftfish)
 Psenes sio Haedrich, 1970 (Twospine driftfish)

References

Nomeidae
Extant Rupelian first appearances
Rupelian genus first appearances
Taxa named by Achille Valenciennes